Kadambini Bose Ganguly (18 July 1861 – 3 October 1923) was one of the first Indian female doctors who practised with a degree in modern medicine. She was the first Indian woman to practice medicine in India. Ganguly was the first woman to gain admission to Calcutta Medical College in 1884, subsequently trained in Scotland, and established a successful medical practice in India. She was the first woman speaker in the Indian National Congress.

Early life 
Kadambini was born in Bengali Kayastha family as Kadambini Basu who was the daughter of Brahmo reformer Braja Kishore Basu. She was born on 18 July 1861 at Bhagalpur, Bengal Presidency (modern day Bihar) in British India, raised in Barisal.  The family was from Chandsi, in Barisal which is now in Bangladesh. Her father was headmaster of Bhagalpur School. He and Abhay Charan Mallick started the movement for women's emancipation at Bhagalpur, establishing the women's organisation Bhagalpur Mahila Samiti in 1863, the first in India.

Despite coming from an upper caste Bengali community that did not support women's education, Kadambini initially received English education at the Brahmo Eden Female School, Dacca; subsequently at Hindu Mahila Vidyalaya, Ballygunj Calcutta which was renamed as Banga Mahila Vidyalaya in 1876. The school merged with Bethune School (established by Bethune) in 1878 and she became the first woman to pass the University of Calcutta entrance examination. She passed the FA exam in 1880. It was partly in recognition of her efforts that Bethune College first introduced FA (First Arts), and then graduation courses in 1883. She and Chandramukhi Basu became the first graduates from Bethune College, and also the first female graduates in the country.

Personal life 

Kadambini Bose married Dwarakanath Ganguly on 12 June 1883, 11 days before joining Calcutta Medical College. As the mother of eight children, she had to devote considerable time to her household affairs. She was deft in needlework. Among her children, Jyotirmayee was a freedom fighter and Prabhat Chandra was a journalist. Her step-daughter was married to Upendrakishore Ray Chowdhury, grandfather of filmmaker Satyajit Ray.

American historian David Kopf notes that Ganguly "was appropriately enough the most accomplished and liberated Brahmo woman of her time", and her relationship with her husband Dwarkanath Ganguly "was most unusual in being founded on mutual love, sensitivity and intelligence." Kopf argues that Ganguly was highly unusual even among emancipated women of contemporary Bengali society, and that "her ability to rise above circumstances and to realize her potential as a human being made her a prize attraction to Sadharan Brahmos dedicated ideologically to the liberation of Bengal's women."

Ganguly died on October 3, 1923, after having conducted an operation the same day.

Criticism from conservative quarters
Ganguly was heavily criticised by the conservative society of her time. After returning to India from Edinburgh and campaigning for women's rights, she was indirectly called a 'whore' in the Bengali magazine Bangabashi. Her husband Dwarkanath Ganguly took the case to court and won, with a jail sentence of 6 months meted out to the editor Mahesh Pal.

In popular culture
A Bengali television serial Prothoma Kadambini based on Ganguly's biography was telecast on Star Jalsha beginning in March 2020, starring Solanki Roy and Honey Bafna in the lead. Another Bengali series named Kadambini, starring Ushasi Ray as Ganguly, was telecast on Zee Bangla in 2020.

On 18 July 2021, Google celebrated Ganguly's 160th birth anniversary with a doodle on its homepage in India.

Notes

References

Further reading 
 
 Sengupta, Subodh Chandra and Bose, Anjali (editors), (1976/1998), Sansad Bangali Charitabhidhan (Biographical dictionary) in Bengali, pp 79–80, 
 

1861 births
1923 deaths
People from Bhagalpur
Brahmos
Medical doctors from Kolkata
Scientists from Bihar
19th-century Indian medical doctors
Indian women medical doctors
20th-century Indian women scientists
20th-century Indian medical doctors
19th-century Indian women scientists
Women scientists from Bihar
Bethune College alumni
University of Calcutta alumni
Medical doctors from Bihar
20th-century women physicians
19th-century women physicians
Scientists from West Bengal